John Bartley (15 January 1909 – 10 October 1929) was an English professional footballer who played as a wing half for Sunderland.

References

1909 births
1929 deaths
People from Houghton-le-Spring
Footballers from Tyne and Wear
English footballers
Association football wing halves
Sunderland A.F.C. players
English Football League players